Oil Trough School District was a school district headquartered in Oil Trough, Arkansas.

On July 1, 1990, the Oil Trough School District was dissolved, with portions going to the Newark School District and the Southside School District. The Newark district merged into the Cedar Ridge School District on July 1, 2004.

Further reading
  (Download) - Map of the Oil Trough District

References

Defunct school districts in Arkansas
1990 disestablishments in Arkansas
School districts disestablished in 1990
Education in Independence County, Arkansas